Invisible Hour is the thirteenth studio album by American musician Joe Henry. It was released in June 2014 under Work Song Recordings.

Track listing
All songs by Joe Henry except where noted

Personnel

 Joe Henry – vocals, guitars
 Jay Bellerose – drums, percussion
 Jennifer Condos – electric bass
 Levon Henry – clarinet, bass clarinet, soprano and tenor saxophones
 Greg Leisz – acoustic guitars, mandola, mandocello, Weissenborn
 David Piltch – upright bass ("Invisible Hour", "Lead Me On")
 John Smith – acoustic guitar, mandola ("Slide"), backing vocals
 Lisa Hannigan – vocals ("Lead Me On")
 The Milk Carton Kids (Kenneth Pattengale, Joey Ryan) – backing vocals

References 

2014 albums
Joe Henry albums
Albums produced by Joe Henry